Nausithoe is a genus of jellyfishes belonging to the family Nausithoidae.

The genus has almost cosmopolitan distribution.

Species 
There are 22 species recognized in the genus Nausithoe

Nausithoe phaeacum 
Nausithoe albatrossi 
Nausithoe albida 
Nausithoe atlantica 
Nausithoe challengeri 
Nausithoe clausi 
Nausithoe eumedusoides 
Nausithoe globifera 
Nausithoe hagenbecki 
Nausithoe limpida 
Nausithoe maculata  accepted as Nausithoe aurea 
Nausithoe marginata 
Nausithoe picta 
Nausithoe planulophora 
Nausithoe punctata 
Nausithoe racemosa 
Nausithoe rubra 
Nausithoe simplex 
Nausithoe sorbei 
Nausithoe thieli 
Nausithoe werneri Jarms, 1990

References

Scyphozoan genera
Nausithoidae